STS-92 was a Space Shuttle mission to the International Space Station (ISS) flown by Space Shuttle  Discovery. STS-92 marked the 100th mission of the Space Shuttle. It was launched from Kennedy Space Center, Florida, 11 October 2000.

Crew

Spacewalks
 Chiao and McArthur  – EVA 1
EVA 1 Start: 15 October 2000 – 14:27 UTC
EVA 1 End: 15 October 2000 – 20:55 UTC
Duration: 6 hours, 28 minutes
 López-Alegría and Wisoff  – EVA 2
EVA 2 Start: 16 October 2000 – 14:15 UTC
EVA 2 End: 16 October 2000 – 21:22 UTC
Duration: 7 hours, 07 minutes
 Chiao and McArthur  – EVA 3
EVA 3 Start: 17 October 2000 – 14:30 UTC
EVA 3 End: 17 October 2000 – 21:18 UTC
Duration: 6 hours, 48 minutes
 López-Alegría and Wisoff  – EVA 4
EVA 4 Start: 18 October 2000 – 15:00 UTC
EVA 4 End: 18 October 2000 – 21:56 UTC
Duration: 6 hours, 56 minutes

Mission highlights

STS-92 was an ISS assembly flight that brought the Z1 truss, Control Moment Gyros, Pressurized Mating Adapter-3 (PMA-3) (mounted on a Spacelab pallet) and two DDCU (Heat pipes) to the space station.

The Z1 truss was the first exterior framework installed on the ISS and allowed the first U.S. solar arrays to be temporarily installed on Unity for early power during flight 4A. The Ku-band communication system supported early science capabilities and U.S. television on flight 6A.

The mission included seven days of docked operations with the space station, four EVAs, and two ingress opportunities.

Over the course of four scheduled spacewalks, two teams of space walkers and an experienced robot arm operator collaborated to install the Z1 (Z for zenith port) truss structure on top of the U.S. Unity connecting node on the growing station and to deliver the third Pressurized Mating Adapter (PMA 3) to the ISS for the future berthing of new station components and to accommodate shuttle dockings.

The Z1 truss was the first permanent lattice-work structure for the ISS, very much like a girder, setting the stage for the future addition of the station's major trusses or backbones. The Z1 fixture also served as the platform on which the huge U.S. solar arrays were mounted on the next shuttle assembly flight, STS-97. The Z1 truss included many elements of the Communications and Tracking subsystem.  The hardware included a Transmitter/Receiver/Controller (SGTRC) built by L3 Communications Systems-East in Camden, NJ. John Schina was the Chief Engineer of the ISS Program at L3.

The Z1 contains four large gyroscopic devices, called Control Moment Gyroscope (CMGs), which are used to maneuver the space station into the proper orientation on orbit once they were activated following the installation of the U.S. laboratory.

During the fourth spacewalk, astronauts Wisoff and López-Alegría tested the SAFER jet backpack, flying up to 50 feet while remaining tethered to the spacecraft.

Media

See also

List of human spaceflights
List of International Space Station spacewalks
List of Space Shuttle missions
List of spacewalks 2000–2014
Outline of space science

References

External links
 NASA mission summary 
 STS-92 Video Highlights 

Spacecraft launched in 2000
2000 in the United States
STS-092
Edwards Air Force Base
Articles containing video clips